Kya Dill Mein Hai is a Hindi language Indian drama television series which premiered on 1 December 2007 on 9X. The series stars Aamir Ali, Sanjeeda Sheikh and Abigail Jain.

Plot
The story centers around the life of an 18-year-old girl, Kakun, who goes against her parents wishes to marry a man of her dreams, Anurag. She faces challenges to her goal. The entry of the advocate Naina Oberoi and how Rahul (Anurag's real name) falls for Naina and incidents that happen after that.

Cast
 Aamir Ali as Rahul Punj / Anurag
 Abigail Jain as Kakoon Rahul Punj
 Sanjeeda Sheikh as Advocate Naina Oberoi
 Kratika Sengar as Naina Mann, Dinesh and Devi's daughter
 Krystle D'Souza as Tamanna Punj
 Anita Hassanandani as Tapur
 Papiya Sengupta as mother of Kakoon and Naina
 Deepak Qazir Kejriwal as Ghosh Babu
 Anand Suryavanshi as Aniket
 Sandeep Rajora as Siddharth Punj

References

Balaji Telefilms television series
9X (TV channel) original programming
Indian drama television series
2007 Indian television series debuts
2008 Indian television series endings